Aethes conomochla is a moth of the family Tortricidae. It was described by Edward Meyrick in 1933. It is only known from Kashmir (described from Gulmarg).

References

External links

conomochla
Moths described in 1933
Moths of Asia
Taxa named by Edward Meyrick